Melinda S. Allen is an American–New Zealand archaeologist. She is currently a full professor at the University of Auckland.

Academic career

Melinda gained her BA in anthropology and biology from the University of Arizona, followed by her Master of Arts in anthropology (archaeology) from the University of Hawaiʻi at Mānoa. After a PhD titled 'Dynamic landscapes and human subsistence: Archaeological investigations on Aitutaki Island, southern Cook Islands'  at the University of Washington (Seattle), Allen moved to the Bernice Pauahi Bishop Museum. In 1996 she took up a position as lecturer at the University of Auckland, rising to full professor where she specialises in Bioarchaeology and Paleoecology, and curates the university's Anthropology Zooarchaeological Reference Collection.

Selected works 
 Allen, Melinda S. "New ideas about late Holocene climate variability in the central Pacific." Current Anthropology 47, no. 3 (2006): 521–535.
 Allen, Melinda S. "Style and function in East Polynesian fish-hooks." Antiquity 70, no. 267 (1996): 97–116.
 Allen, Melinda S., and Rod Wallace. "New evidence from the East Polynesian gateway: Substantive and methodological results from Aitutaki, southern Cook Islands." Radiocarbon 49, no. 3 (2007): 1163–1179.
 Allen, Melinda S. "Bet-hedging strategies, agricultural change, and unpredictable environments: historical development of dryland agriculture in Kona, Hawaii." Journal of Anthropological Archaeology 23, no. 2 (2004): 196–224.
 Allen, Melinda S. "Resolving long-term change in Polynesian marine fisheries." Asian Perspectives (2002): 195–212.

References

External links
  
 

Living people
New Zealand women academics
University of Hawaiʻi at Mānoa alumni
Academic staff of the University of Auckland
New Zealand archaeologists
New Zealand women archaeologists
Year of birth missing (living people)
21st-century New Zealand women writers